According to older historiography, Iljko was a duke in Croatia from 876 until 878, and a member of the Domagojević dynasty, probably the son of Domagoj.

However, it has later generally been accepted that his name was a consequence of a wrong translation of the Chronicle of Dandolo, a Latin text written by Andrea Dandolo in the 14th century. The name of the unknown prince was probably the result of Dandolo's fantasy. During the specified timespan a son of Domagoj ruled Croatia, but his name was not preserved.

See also
Domagojević dynasty
List of rulers of Croatia

References

Dukes of Croatia
9th-century Croatian people
9th-century rulers in Europe
Medieval Croatian nobility
878 deaths
Year of birth unknown